Massimiliano Benassi (born 11 November 1981) is a former Italian association footballer who played as a goalkeeper.

Career
After having played in Italian third category (Serie c1-c2, now called "Prima Divisione" and "Seconda Divisione"), he joined the promotion in "Serie B" with U.S. Sassuolo Calcio in 2008. Then he played on good levels with Perugia Calcio, despite the bad results of the team until 2010

Lecce
at the end of the last championship, in fact, the team failed the subscription on 2010\2011 Lega Pro Championship, because of a lack of money, like several other teams, and Perugia Calcio was forced to restart from "Serie D", leaving professional football after 58 years. Thus, Max Benassi signed with U.S. Lecce.

On 28 June 2011 he extended his contract with Lecce for one more year. Two days later, Lecce sold its first choice goalkeeper Antonio Rosati to Napoli. Initially he was the understudy of Júlio Sérgio after Lecce borrowed Júlio Sérgio from Roma on 28 July. However J.Sérgio performance was criticized and later due to injury, Benassi became the first choice despite also sidelined in December. In January he returned to field as starting keeper while J. Sérgio was on the bench.

References

External links
http://aic.football.it/scheda/5558/benassi-massimiliano.htm

1981 births
Living people
People from Alatri
Footballers from Lazio
Italian footballers
Association football goalkeepers
U.S. Poggibonsi players
A.C. Sansovino players
S.S. Juve Stabia players
U.S. Sassuolo Calcio players
A.C. Perugia Calcio players
U.S. Lecce players
Reggina 1914 players
S.S. Arezzo players
Casertana F.C. players
Serie A players
Serie B players
Serie C players
Serie D players
Sportspeople from the Province of Frosinone